Mattia Trianni (born 16 January 1993) is a German footballer who plays as a winger for Atlas Delmenhorst.

References

External links
 Profile at uslchampionship.com

1993 births
Living people
Sportspeople from Heilbronn
German people of Italian descent
German footballers
Footballers from Baden-Württemberg
Association football midfielders
USL Championship players
3. Liga players
Regionalliga players
VfB Stuttgart players
TSG 1899 Hoffenheim players
Stuttgarter Kickers players
1. FC Bruchsal players
BSV Schwarz-Weiß Rehden players
TSG Neustrelitz players
VfR Aalen players
FC Viktoria 1889 Berlin players
Reno 1868 FC players
SV Babelsberg 03 players
Atlas Delmenhorst players
German expatriate footballers
German expatriate sportspeople in the United States
Expatriate soccer players in the United States